Carlos Rodríguez Guevara (born 19 December 1969) is a Mexican politician from the National Action Party. In 2009 he served as Deputy of the LX Legislature of the Mexican Congress representing Guanajuato.

References

1969 births
Living people
Politicians from Guanajuato
National Action Party (Mexico) politicians
21st-century Mexican politicians
Deputies of the LX Legislature of Mexico
Members of the Chamber of Deputies (Mexico) for Guanajuato